Matai is a city in the Minya Governorate in Upper Egypt. It lies between Samalout and Beni Mazar. It is identified with the ancient town of Matoi and its name comes from the Coptic word for "soldier" (matoi).

Towns

The city of Matai has the following villages:

 Abu Aziz
 Abu Haseba
 Abu Shehata
 Abwan
 Bany Hassan
 Bardnouha
 El-Farokeya
 El-Kawady
 El-Kofor
 El Manahra
 Helwa
 Kom Matai
 Marzok
 Matai El-Balad
 Menbal
 Nazlet Amr
 Nazlet Thabet
 Selah El-Gharbiya
 gabal elter
 Gawada
 shark almahata
 alfawareqa

Notable people from Matai
Saint Abdel Messih El-Makari
Dr. Malak Azer Eskander
Alla Mohammed Hassan Limt ( Musician )

See also

 List of cities and towns in Egypt

References

Matai albald